is a Japanese manga series written and illustrated by toufu. It has been serialized in Houbunsha's Comic Fuz website since March 2019, with its chapters collected into seven tankōbon volumes as of October 2022. An anime television series adaptation by Silver Link and Blade is set to premiere in 2023.

Characters

Media

Manga
Written and illustrated by toufu, Level 1 Demon Lord and One Room Hero began serialization in Houbunsha's Comic Fuz website in March 2019. As of October 2022, seven tankōbon volumes have been released. Seven Seas Entertainment has licensed the series in print and digital format.

Volume list

Anime
An anime television series adaptation was announced on March 29, 2022. The series will be produced by Silver Link and Blade and directed by Keisuke Inoue, with scripts written by Toshiya Ono, character designs by Yoshihiro Watanabe, and music composed by R.O.N. It is set to premiere in 2023.

References

External links
 
 

2023 anime television series debuts
Anime series based on manga
Comedy anime and manga
Fantasy anime and manga
Houbunsha manga
Japanese webcomics
Seinen manga
Seven Seas Entertainment titles
Silver Link
Upcoming anime television series
Webcomics in print